The 2016 VTV Awards (Vietnamese: Ấn tượng VTV - Chuyển động 2016) is a ceremony honouring the outstanding achievement in television on the Vietnam Television (VTV) network from August 2015 to July 2016. It took place on September 7, 2016 in Ho Chi Minh City and hosted by Trấn Thành & Ái Phương.

Winners and nominees
(Winners denoted in bold)

Presenters

Special performances

In Memoriam 

Thanh Tùng - Composer
Châu Huế - Director
Thúy Lan - Singer
Hán Văn Tình - Actor, Comedian
Lương Minh - Composer
Vũ Quốc Hương - Cinematographer
Trần Lập - Rocker, Songwriter

References

External links

2016 television awards
VTV Awards
2016 in Vietnamese television
September 2016 events in Vietnam